Mohamed Abubakar Mohamed (born 10 January 1998) is a Somali footballer who plays as a midfielder for the Somalia national football team.

Club career
In February 2020, after spells at Walton Casuals, Banstead Athletic and Northwood, Abukar signed for Isthmian League club Brightlingsea Regent.

International career
On 5 September 2019, Mohamed made his debut for Somalia in a 1–0 win against Zimbabwe. The win marked Somalia's first ever FIFA World Cup qualification victory.

References

1998 births
Living people
Association football midfielders
Somalian footballers
Somalia international footballers
Walton Casuals F.C. players
Banstead Athletic F.C. players
Northwood F.C. players
Brightlingsea Regent F.C. players
Isthmian League players